The Trident Charter Company is a shipping firm based in Guernsey, Channel Islands. The company operates the ferry route between Guernsey and Herm using the Herm Trident V, a twin Iveco diesel-powered catamaran with a steel hull. The ferry sails daily from St Peter Port Harbour, and docks at either Herm Harbour or Rosaire Steps, depending on the state of the tide. The crossing takes between 15 and 20 minutes depending on sea-state and tide.

The company also owns the Herm Trident VI (a sister vessel to the Herm Trident V) which was built at the Gravesend shipyard in 1991. In the summer season, Trident lease the boat to Isle of Sark Shipping. Both Herm Trident V and Herm Trident VI are licensed to carry 250 passengers, have a service speed of 10 knots and a top speed of around 13 knots.

As well as the Trident V and VI ferries, the company used to run the Herm Clipper and the Lady Dorothy, traditional single-hulled and single-engined wooden ferries. The Herm Clipper and the Lady Dorothy acted as overflow vessels on busy days and were also run separately through Herm Seaways (a subsidiary of Trident Charter Company) who used them for the popular "Puffin Patrol" cruises around the South East coast of Guernsey and the back of Herm. The Lady Dorothy is now operating on Ullswater, and the Herm Clipper is now operating as part of the Greenway Ferries fleet as the MV Clipper.

On 23 August 2003 in poor visibility, the Herm Trident VI ran aground on Percée Rocks near Herm Island. The vessel remained afloat and the 179 passengers were safely evacuated onto the Herm Trident V. The ferry then made its way to St Peter Port under its own steam. Despite this incident the company has a good safety record. In 1994, the Herm Trident IV was at anchor when it was rammed and sunk by the Norman Commodore when she lost engine control.

References

External links
Trident Ferry website. 

Ferry companies of Guernsey
Herm